Hyperfocus is an intense form of mental concentration or visualization that focuses consciousness on a subject, topic, or task.  In some individuals, various subjects or topics may also include daydreams, concepts, fiction, the imagination, and other objects of the mind. Hyperfocus on a certain subject can cause side-tracking away from  assigned or important tasks.

Psychiatrically, it is considered to be a trait of ADHD together with inattention, and it has been proposed as a trait of other conditions, such as schizophrenia, and autism spectrum disorder (ASD).

Hyperfocus may bear a relationship to the concept of flow. In some circumstances, both flow and hyperfocus can be an aid to achievement, but in other circumstances, the same focus and behavior could be a liability, distracting from the task at hand. However, unlike hyperfocus, "flow" is often described in more positive terms, suggesting they are not two sides of the same condition under contrasting circumstance or intellect.

Psychiatric symptom 

Hyperfocus may in some cases also be symptomatic of a psychiatric condition. In some cases, it is referred to as perseveration—an inability or impairment in switching tasks or activities ("set-shifting"), or desisting from mental or physical response repetition (gestures, words, thoughts) despite absence or cessation of a stimulus. It is distinguished from stereotypy (a highly repetitive idiosyncratic behaviour).

Conditions associated with hyperfocus or perseveration include neurodevelopmental disorders, particularly those considered to be on the autism spectrum and attention deficit hyperactivity disorder (ADHD). In ADHD, it may be a coping mechanism or a symptom of emotional self-regulation. So called "twice exceptional" people, with high intellect and learning disabilities, may have either or both of hyperfocus and perseverative behaviours. They are often mimicked by similar conditions involving executive dysfunction or emotional dysregulation, and lack of diagnosis and treatment may lead to further co-morbidity.

ADHD 

In ADHD, formulation and thinking can be slower than in neurotypical people (though this is not universal), and may be "long winded or tangential". These inattentive symptoms occur dually with what has been termed "hyperfocus" by the 2019 European Consensus Statement on Adult ADHD. The over-concentration or hyperfocus often occurs if the person finds something "very interesting and/or provide(s) instant gratification, such as computer games or online chatting. For such activities, concentration may last for hours on end, in a very focused manner." 

ADHD is a difficulty in directing one's attention (an executive function of the frontal lobe), not a lack of attention.

Conditions unlikely to be confused with hyperfocus often involve repetition of thoughts or behaviors such as obsessive–compulsive disorder (OCD), trauma, and some cases of traumatic brain injury.

Autism 
Two major symptoms of autism spectrum disorder (ASD) include repetitive sounds or movements and fixation on various things including topics and activities. Hyperfocus in the context of ASD has also been referred to as the inability to redirect thoughts or tasks as the situation changes (cognitive flexibility). 

One suggested explanation for hyperfocus in those with ASD is that the activity they are hyperfocused on is predictable. Aversion to unpredictable situations is a characteristic of ASD, while focusing on something predictable, they will have trouble changing to a task that is unpredictable.

Schizophrenia 
Schizophrenia is a mental condition characterized by a disconnect from reality, including grandiose delusions, disorganized thinking, and abnormal social behavior.  Recently, hyperfocus has come into attention as a part of the cognitive symptoms associated with the disorder. In this use, hyperfocus is an intense focus on processing the information in front of them. This hypothesis suggests that hyperfocus is the reason those afflicted with schizophrenia experience difficulty spreading their attention across multiple things.

Psychopathy 
Some research has shown that psychopaths are hyperfocused on obtaining a reward and as a result their ability to use contextual cues, punishment or contextual information for adjusting their behaviour may be impaired. Moreover, they develop tunnel vision blocking out any stimulation (such as fear of achieving the goal).

See also
 Flow (psychology)
 Hunter vs. farmer hypothesis
 Mind-wandering (antonym)

References

Further reading
 
 
 
 
 
 
 

Memory
Symptoms and signs of mental disorders
Attention
Interest (psychology)
Attention deficit hyperactivity disorder
Autism